Stuart Linder is a Beverly Hills-based plastic surgeon known for his appearances on several reality and news television shows. Linder is also a published author.

Media Appearances 
Linder is a member of the medical advisory board for The Dr. Oz Show, as well as an editorial advisory board member for Mehmet Oz's social media/health website ShareCare, He has worked as a correspondent with Entertainment Tonight for plastic and reconstructive surgical issues. He has appeared on 20/20 exploring most innovative techniques on breast enhancement. Linder has appeared on K-CAL 9. He has also appeared on The Doctors. Dr. Linder was featured in the Louis Theroux BBC documentary Under the Knife.

Linder appeared with Courtney Stodden in 2013 as she announced that he performed her breast-augmentation surgery.

Published Books 

Linder is the author of The Beverly Hills Shape: The Truth About Plastic Surgery.

References

External links 
 Official Website
 

1965 births
Living people
Participants in American reality television series
American plastic surgeons
University of California, Los Angeles alumni